The 2013 World Outgames is a multi-sports event held from 31 July - 11 August 2013 in Antwerp. It was the third iteration of the World Outgames, featuring competitions in 36 sports, and coinciding with Antwerp Pride Week.

References

External links
 Website

World Outgames
Sports competitions in Antwerp
World Outgames
World Outgames
2013 in LGBT history
International sports competitions hosted by Belgium
Multi-sport events in Belgium
July 2013 sports events in Europe
2010s in Antwerp